Kyle Connelly (born 22 April 1980) is a Canadian luger. He competed in the men's singles event at the 2002 Winter Olympics.

References

External links
 

1980 births
Living people
Canadian male lugers
Olympic lugers of Canada
Lugers at the 2002 Winter Olympics
Sportspeople from Ottawa